Westlawn Cemetery is a historic cemetery on Concord Road at Country Road in Westford, Massachusetts. Established in 1761 as the West Burying Ground, it is one of the town's oldest cemeteries. There are approximately 400 marked burials, generally laid out in rows running east–west. One of its most prominent burials is that of Colonel John Robinson, who led Westford's minutemen in the 1775 Battles of Lexington and Concord.

The cemetery was listed on the National Register of Historic Places in 2005.

See also
 National Register of Historic Places listings in Middlesex County, Massachusetts

References

Cemeteries on the National Register of Historic Places in Massachusetts
Cemeteries in Middlesex County, Massachusetts
National Register of Historic Places in Middlesex County, Massachusetts
Buildings and structures in Westford, Massachusetts